Alexander of Paris, also known as Alexander of Bernay, was a Norman poet of the 12th century, who wrote Li romans d'Alexandre (Romance of Alexander), one of the first poems written in French on the mythical exploits of Alexander the Great. It was composed in twelve-syllable lines, named alexandrines after this work (or possible after him). He was born in Bernay, Eure.

References

People from Bernay, Eure
French poets
12th-century French writers
12th-century French poets
French male poets